Peñon Viejo is a station along Line A of the Mexico City Metro.  It is located in the Colonia Santa Martha Acatitla Norte and Colonia Santa Martha Acatitla Sur neighborhoods of the Iztapalapa borough of Mexico City.

The logo is an Aztec-based glyph showing a rock that represents the Peñon Viejo formation near the station. The station was opened on 12 August 1991.

From 23 April to 25 June 2020, the station was temporarily closed due to the COVID-19 pandemic in Mexico.

Ridership

References

External links 

Mexico City Metro Line A stations
Railway stations opened in 1991
1991 establishments in Mexico
Mexico City Metro stations in Iztapalapa